D’addario or Daddario is the surname of the following people:
Emilio Q. Daddario (1918–2010), American politician, father of Richard, grandfather of Alexandra
Richard Daddario, American attorney and politician, father of Alexandra and Matthew
Alexandra Daddario (born 1986), American actress and model
Matthew Daddario (born 1987), American actor, brother of Alexandra
Gary D'Addario, retired police commander, television technical advisor and actor
Ray D'Addario, American photographer
D'Addario (manufacturer), a manufacturer of musical instrument strings and accessories
 Major General Lorenzo D'Addario (born 1964) a member of the Italian Armed Forces, and the 23rd Commander of the Kosovo Force

See also 
 Addario